The Clostridiales-3 RNA motif is a conserved RNA structure that was discovered by bioinformatics.
Clostridiales-3 motifs are found in Clostridiales.
Clostridiales-3 RNAs likely function in trans as sRNAs and, structurally, largely consist of several hairpins.

References

Non-coding RNA